Pertev Naili Boratav, born Mustafa Pertev (September 2, 1907 – March 16, 1998) was a Turkish folklorist and researcher of folk literature. He has been characterized as 'the founding father of Turkish folkloristics during the Republic'.

Life
Pertev Naili Boratav was born in 1907 in Darıdere - today known as Zlatograd, in Bulgaria, but then a town in the Sanjak of Gümülcine in the Ottoman Empire. He was educated at Istanbul High School before entering Istanbul University in 1927, graduating from the Turkish Language and Literature Department in 1930. In 1931-32 he worked as an assistant to the historian Mehmet Fuat Koprulu. In the period between 1941 and 1944 he was among the directors of a monthly sociology journal entitled Yurt ve Dünya based in Ankara. It was banned in 1944 due to its communist leaning. After establishing Turkey's first Department of Folk Literature in 1946, Boratav was one of three professors who in 1947 were accused of promoting socialism and undermining nationalism. Though eventually acquitted in his 1948 trial, his department was closed and he was forced to move to Paris in 1952. He died in Paris in 1998.

A student of Koprulu and Georges Dumézil, Boratav was also influenced by the writings of Arnold Van Gennep. He was pioneering in giving attention to performative aspects of folklore. The classification of Turkish folktales which he undertook with Wolfram Eberhard modified the comparative approach of Antti Aarne, by insisting that detailed classification of folktales of a particular culture needed to precede attempts at cross-cultural research.

Works
 Köroğlu destanı [The Köroğlu epic], 1931
 Halk hikâyeleri ve halk hikâyeciliği [Folk Narratives and Folk Narration], 1946
 (with Wolfram Eberhard) Typen türkischer Volksmärchen [Types of the Turkish Folktale], 1953
 Les histoires d'ours en Anatolie [The Bear Stories of Anatolia], 1955
 Türkische Volksmärchen [Turkish Folk Tales], 1967

References

Further reading
 Birkalan, Hande, 'Pertev Naili Boratav, Turkish Politics, and the University Events', Turkish Studies Association Bulletin 25:1 (2001), pp.39-60
 Birkalan, Hande, 'Nachrichten: Pertev Naili Boratav (1907-1998), Fabula 45 (2004), pp.113-17

1907 births
1998 deaths
Turkish folklorists
Turkish Marxists